Esterhuizen is a surname. Notable people with the surname include:

André Esterhuizen (born 1994), South African rugby union player
Bernard Esterhuizen (born 1992), South African track cyclist
JR Esterhuizen (born 1991), South African rugby union player
Quintin Esterhuizen (born 1994), Namibian rugby union player
Riaan Esterhuizen (born 1994), South African rugby union player
Willie Esterhuizen, South African actor